In cell biology, a lymphokine-activated killer cell (also known as a LAK cell) is a white blood cell that has been stimulated to kill tumor cells. If lymphocytes are cultured in the presence of Interleukin 2, it results in the development of effector cells which are cytotoxic to tumor cells.

Mechanism
It has been shown that lymphocytes, when exposed to Interleukin 2, are capable of lysing fresh, non-cultured cancer cells, both primary and metastatic. LAK cells respond to these lymphokines, particularly IL-2, by lysing tumor cells that were already known to be resistant to NK cell activity.

The mechanism of LAK cells is distinctive from that of natural killer cells because they can lyse cells that NK cells cannot. LAK cells are also capable of acting against cells that do not display the major histocompatibility complex, as has been shown by the ability to cause lysis in non-immunogenic, allogeneic and syngeneic tumors. LAK cells are specific to tumor cells and do not display activity against normal cells.

Cancer Treatment
LAK cells, along with the administration of IL-2 have been experimentally used to treat cancer in mice and humans, but there is very high toxicity with this treatment - Severe fluid retention was the major side effect of therapy, although all side effects resolved after interleukin-2 administration was stopped. LAK cell therapy is a method that uses interleukin 2 (IL-2) to enhance the number of lymphocytes in an in vitro setting, and it has formed the foundation of many immunotherapy assays that are now in use. LAK cells have shown potential as a cellular agent for cancer therapy and have been utilized therapeutically in association with IL-2 for the treatment of various cancers. LAK cells have anticancer efficacy against homologous carcinoma cells and can grow ex vivo in the presence of IL-2. In melanoma and gastric cancer cells, intercellular adhesion molecule 1 (ICAM-1) antibody can significantly inhibit in vitro LAK-induced lysis of cancer cells. A study has shown that ICAM1 in lung cancer cells increases LAK cell-mediated tumor cell death as a new anti-tumor mechanism.

Notes and references

External links 
 

Cell biology